Peter Rock may refer to:

Peter Rock (footballer) (1941–2021), East German footballer
Peter Rock (musician) (1945–2016), Chilean rock and roll musician
Peter Rock (novelist) (born 1967), American novelist

See also
Pete Rock (born 1970), American record producer, DJ, and rapper